Heydar Aliyev Stadium is a multi-use stadium in Imishli, Azerbaijan. It is named after the former Azerbaijani president Heydar Aliyev. It is currently used mostly for football matches and is the home stadium of Mil-Muğan.  The stadium holds 8,500 people and was opened in 2006.

Football venues in Azerbaijan